Josh Bateman (born 25 September 1986) is a former professional rugby league footballer.

Bateman was born in Grenfell, New South Wales, Australia.

References

External links
Penrith Panthers profile

1986 births
Living people
Australian rugby league players
Penrith Panthers players
Windsor Wolves players
Rugby league five-eighths
Rugby league players from New South Wales